Elections to Suffolk County Council were held on 4 June 2009 as part of the 2009 United Kingdom local elections on the same day as the elections to the European Parliament. 75 councillors were elected from 63 electoral divisions, which returned either one or two county councillors each by first-past-the-post voting for a four-year term of office. The electoral divisions were the same as those used at the previous election in 2005.

Labour and the Conservatives were the only parties with candidates standing in all sixty-three electoral divisions. The Liberal Democrats and the Green Party were the only other parties which fielded enough candidates to achieve a majority.

All locally registered electors (British, Irish, Commonwealth and European Union citizens) who were aged 18 or over on Thursday 4 June 2009 were entitled to vote in the local elections. Those who were temporarily away from their ordinary address (for example, away working, on holiday, in student accommodation or in hospital) were also entitled to vote in the local elections, although those who had moved abroad and registered as overseas electors cannot vote in the local elections. It is possible to register to vote at more than one address (such as a university student who had a term-time address and lives at home during holidays) at the discretion of the local Electoral Register Office, but it remains an offence to vote more than once in the same local government election.

Summary

The Conservatives won the election, being returned to power with 55 seats, a net gain of eleven, while the Liberal Democrats won eleven (a gain of two) and thus replaced Labour as the main opposition party, Labour losing seventeen seats overall and ending with only four. Two Independents were elected, while the Green Party also won two seats and the UK Independence Party won one.

The Conservatives became more representative of the county's urban areas, particularly in Waveney and Ipswich, where they took seats from Labour.  This contrasted with their performance in 2005 being mainly down to piling up votes in rural divisions.  That said, the party lost seats in Bury St Edmunds and also in Mid Suffolk.  Despite mounting strong challenges in the divisions lost to the Liberal Democrats in subsequent by-elections, they failed to regain them.  The party was heartened by almost tripling their majority to thirty nine seats in comparison to the one of fifteen in 2005.

The Liberal Democrats had fought a strong campaign and held all of their divisions and added a further two Councillors to their tally.

The smaller parties benefited from the Expenses Scandal hitting the main parties, which saw the Greens and an Independent gain three divisions from the Conservatives, and the UK Independence party taking a seat from Labour.

Labour itself was left with a severely reduced tally, and returned to Endeavour House with just four Councillors, all from Ipswich. Of these, two were from the Co-Operative Party.

In 2005 the Conservatives had won 42 seats, Labour 22, the Liberal Democrats 7, and one Independent was elected. Subsequent by-elections after this saw the Conservatives gain a seat from Labour, but lose two to the Liberal Democrats.

Government Formation
Conservative group leader Jeremy Pembroke (Cosford) remained as council leader until April 2011, when Mark Bee (Beccles) succeeded him. Lib Dem leader Kathy Pollard (Belstead Brook) became leader of opposition, and Sandy Martin (St John's) became Labour group leader.

Results

Results by District

Babergh

District Summary

Division Results

Forest Heath

District Summary

Division Results

Ipswich

District Summary

Division results

Mid Suffolk

District Summary

Division results

Suffolk Coastal

District Summary

Division results

St. Edmundsbury

District Summary

Division results

}

Waveney

District Summary

Division results

}

}

}

						

}

References

External links
Results for Suffolk County Council Elections 2009

2009 English local elections
2009
2000s in Suffolk